David Garland is Arthur T. Vanderbilt Professor of Law and professor of sociology at New York University, and an honorary professor in Criminology at Edinburgh Law School. He is well known for his historical and sociological studies of penal institutions, for his work on the welfare state, and for his contributions to criminology, social theory, and the study of social control.

Biography 

Born in Dundee, Scotland in 1955, he attended Rosebank Primary School and Harris Academy. In 1977 he graduated from the University of Edinburgh School of Law with an LLB (First Class Honours) and, the following year, from Sheffield University with a postgraduate MA in criminology. In 1984 he completed a PhD in socio-legal studies at the University of Edinburgh, presenting the thesis 'Modern penality : a study of the formation and significance of penal-welfare strategies'. From 1979 until 1997 he taught at the University of Edinburgh's Department of Criminology (which later became the Centre for Law and Society) where he was first a Lecturer, then a Reader, and finally the holder of a Personal Chair in Penology. He has held visiting positions at Leuven University, Belgium and the University of California, Berkeley. He was a Shelby Cullom Davis Fellow in Princeton University's history department, the 2012/2013 Douglas McK. Brown Chair in Law at the University of British Columbia, and was a visiting global professor in NYU Law School's Global Law program. Since 1997, he has been a member of the New York University School of Law faculty, where he holds the Arthur T. Vanderbilt professorship, and is also a full professor in the Department of Sociology. In fall 2014 he was the Shimizu Visiting Professor of Law at the London School of Economics and in spring 2018 a Paris Fellow in NYU's Global Research Initiative program. In the fall of 2022 he held a Visiting Fellowship at Sydney University School of Law. He also holds an honorary professorship at the University of Edinburgh School of Law.

Garland was the founding editor of the international, interdisciplinary journal Punishment & Society. He edited the collection Mass Imprisonment: Social Causes and Consequences (2001) and, with Richard Sparks, he co-edited Criminology and Social Theory (2000). He is the author of an award-winning series of books on punishment and social control – Punishment and Welfare: A History of Penal Strategies (1985), Punishment and Modern Society: A Study in Social Theory (1990); The Culture of Control: Crime and Social Order in Contemporary Society (2001) and Peculiar Institution: America's Death Penalty in an Age of Abolition (2010) – as well as a number of articles on the history and character of criminology. In addition, he has written on such topics as postmodernism, governmentality, risk, moral panics, the concept of culture, and the welfare state.

He is a fellow of the Royal Society of Edinburgh, the British Academy, the American Academy of Arts and Sciences, and the American Society of Criminology. Among the awards he has received for his scholarship are the Sellin-Glueck Award (1993), the Michael J. Hindelang Award (2012) and the Edwin H. Sutherland Award (2012) of the American Society of Criminology and the Mary Douglas Award (2011) and Barrington Moore Award (2011) of the American Sociological Association. In 2006 he was selected for a Guggenheim Fellowship to support his research on capital punishment and American society. He is the recipient of honorary degrees from the Free University of Brussels (2009) and the University of Oslo (2017). His most recent book is The Welfare State: A Very Short Introduction (2016).

Publications 
Punishment and control: 
Peculiar Institution: America's Death Penalty in an Age of Abolition, Harvard University Press (2010)
The Culture of Control: Crime and Social Order in Contemporary Society, University of Chicago Press (2001)
Mass Imprisonment: Social Causes and Consequences, London, Sage Publications (2001)
A Reader on Punishment, Oxford University Press (1994) (Co-edited with A. Duff)
Punishment and Modern Society: A Study in Social Theory, Oxford University Press (1990)
Punishment and Welfare: A History of Penal Strategies, Gower (1985)
The Power to Punish, Gower (1983) (Co-edited with Peter Young)
 "Penality and the Penal State" in Criminology (2013) vol 51 No 3 pp 475–517

Criminology as a discipline: 
Criminology and Social Theory, Oxford University Press (2000) (Co-edited with R. Sparks)
“Criminology’s Place in the Academic Field” in M. Bosworth and C. Hoyle (eds) What is Criminology?, Oxford University Press (2011)
"Of Crimes and Criminals: The Development of Criminology in Britain" in M.Maguire, R.Morgan and R.Reiner (eds), The Oxford Handbook of Criminology, Third Edition (2002)
"Criminological Knowledge and its Relation to Power: Foucault's Genealogy and Criminology Today" in the British Journal of Criminology (1992) vol 32 No. 4

Social theory and criminology: 
“On the Concept of Moral Panic” in Crime, Media, Culture vol 4 No 1, pp 9–30 
“Concepts of Culture in the Sociology of Punishment” in Theoretical Criminology vol 10 No 4, pp 419–447
“The Rise of Risk”, in R. Ericson (ed) Risk and Morality, Toronto: University of Toronto Press (2003), pp 48–86
“Governmentality and the Problem of Crime: Foucault, Criminology, Sociology” Theoretical Criminology (Volume 1 No.2 May 1997), pp. 173–214
"Penal Modernism and Postmodernism" in Blomberg and Cohen (eds) Punishment and Social Control Aldine de Gruyter. 1995

Welfare state: 
"The Emergence of the Idea of the Welfare State in British Political Discourse" History of the Human Sciences (January 2022)
The Welfare State: A Very Short Introduction, Oxford University Press (2016)
"The Welfare State: A Fundamental Dimension of Modern Government" European Journal of Sociology (December 2014)

References

External links
NYU Law School profile
NYU Department of Sociology Profile
British Academy Profile
American Academy of Arts and Sciences Elects National and International Scholars, Artists, Philanthropists, and Business and Civic Leaders
2013 ASA Distinguished Book Award Honorable Mention
2011 ASA Comparative and Historical Sociology Section Barrington Moore Book Award
The American Society of Criminology 2012 Edwin H. Sutherland Award

Living people
People from Dundee
Alumni of the University of Edinburgh
Alumni of the University of Sheffield
Academics of the University of Edinburgh
Scottish emigrants to the United States
New York University faculty
Penologists
Scottish legal scholars
British criminologists
1955 births
British sociologists
Academic journal editors
People educated at Harris Academy
New York University School of Law faculty